The honorary citizenship of the city of Vilnius, Lithuania has been awarded to 20 people since Lithuania regained independence in 1990.

Honorary citizens of Vilnius

References

Vilnius
Vilnius
Honorary citizens of Vilnius